Wasteland Weekend is an annual festival held in Edwards, California. The event is listed as a full immersion event, with all participants required to adhere to the set theme. It has been held annually in September since 2010, except for 2020, when the event was cancelled due to the COVID-19 pandemic. In 2019, the 10th-anniversary edition of Wasteland Weekend was held from September 25 to September 29.

The festival includes post-apocalyptic themed costumes, campsites and vehicles, live bands and DJs, fire, burlesque and other performers, and Jugger matches.

History
Wasteland Weekend has been held annually since 2010. The first Wasteland Weekend received media attention and a video greeting from George Miller, director of the Mad Max films. It has grown from approximately 350 attendees in 2010 to approximately 4,300 in 2019.

Drawing on Mad Max-themed events in other countries, the first event was held in October in California City, California. It was organized by Karol Bartoszynski, Jared Butler, and club promoter Jim Howard. The event featured exhibitions of movie replica cars and bikes, a gyrocopter flyover, vendors, fire dancers, and contests.
Co-Founder James Howard left management in 2010. Co-founder Karol Bartoszynski left in 2014.

The event is currently owned and organized by Jared Butler and Adam Chilson under their company Wasteland World Inc.

In 2017, the event expanded from four to five days, beginning on the last Wednesday of September. 
By the tenth consecutive year in 2019, the sold-out event had over 4,300 participants.
With 2020 being cancelled, year 11 was deferred to 22nd – 26th, 2021.

Theme
The theme of Wasteland Weekend draws heavily from apocalyptic and post-apocalyptic fiction, especially the Mad Max franchise, and requires all attendees to wear appropriately themed clothing. In the early years, Wasteland Weekend was billed as "Mad Max fun in the California sun".
Other influences include Wasteland and the Fallout series of video games.

In Media
In 2016, an episode of "Jay Leno's Garage" hosted by notable tv personality Jay Leno, was filmed on the Wasteland Weekend property, featuring vehicles and participants from the event.

Wasteland Weekend 2017 was featured in the second season of "The Boulet Brothers' Dragula" in which the four remaining competitors had to take part in a photoshoot in a nearby desert and perform as a group at Wasteland Weekend.

Adam Savage's Discovery, Science Channel show "Savage Builds" season 1 episode 3 "Mad Max Melee" featured Butler, several iconic Wasteland Weekend vehicles, and the festival's property.

A 2019 episode of HBO's "Silicon Valley" included a video promo for a new desert event, Rust Fest, and was filmed on the Wasteland property and featured vehicles and participants from the event.

Additional Events
There have been several official post apocalyptic spin-off events from Wasteland Weekend and its organizers including
The Wasteland Film Festival l started in 2013
The Wasteland World Car Show started in 2016
and The Wastelanders Ball started in 2017. The same team also plans to launch an original cyberpunk festival, Neotropolis, in 2022.

References

External links
 Official website
 "Welcome to the Wasteland" comic on The Nib
 GeekXGirls article on event history
 AP Video on 2010 Wasteland Weekend

Mad Max
Counterculture festivals
Festivals in California
Recurring events established in 2010
2010 establishments in California
Tourist attractions in Kern County, California
California City, California